Saga of a Married Man is the seventh studio album by American recording artist Alexander O'Neal. It was originally released in early 2002 by Eagle as the follow-up to the 1996 album Lovers Again. Recording sessions took place at Echo Bay Studios and Hear, Inc. assisted by former Prince drummer, Bobby Z. O'Neal was credited as co-writer on the track "Married Man".

The album was received negatively by the majority of music critics, while other reviewers noted good points to the album. The album went largely unnoticed by the public, being a commercial disappointment, which marked the beginning of a downturn in O'Neal's fortunes on the album charts.

Release history

Track listing

Personnel
Credits are adapted from the album's liner notes.

"He Said She Said"
 Danny Donnelly - guitars
 Brian Steckler - programming, backing vocals
 Greg Wood - backing vocals

"You're Gonna Miss Me"
 Mike Scott - guitars
 French - programming
 VoiceMale - additional backing vocals

"I'm There"
 Mike Scott - guitars
 Bobby Z. - drum programming
 J. Isaac Moore - programming, backing vocals

"My Baby's Gone"
 Mike Scott - guitars
 J. Isaac Moore - programming
 Jeretta Steele - backing vocals

"It's OK"
 Mike Scott - guitars
 J. Isaac Moore - programming, backing vocals

"What You See Is What You Get"
 Alexander O'Neal - performing 
 Cynthia Kampa - performing
 Scott LeGere - piano

"Married Man"
 Mike Scott - guitars
 J. Isaac Moore - programming, backing vocals

"What Is A Man?"
 Mike Scott - guitars
 J. Isaac Moore - programming, backing vocals

"Last Night"
 Mike Scott - guitars
 J. Isaac Moore - programming
 VoiceMale - backing vocals

"Happy Home"
 Mike Scott - guitars
 J. Isaac Moore - programming, backing vocals

Charts

References

External links

Alexander O'Neal albums
2002 albums
Eagle Records albums